"Satisfaction" is a song by Italian DJ Benny Benassi. It was released in Italy in June 2002 as the lead single from his album Hypnotica. Using MacinTalk, the song's vocals consist of two speech synthesizers, one male and one female, repeatedly saying "Push me and then just touch me till I can get my satisfaction". The track was Benassi's debut single and most successful song, peaking at number two in the United Kingdom and earning a gold certification in Australia, Belgium, France, and the United States. As of August 2014, it was the 54th best-selling single of the 21st century in France, with 382,000 units sold. "Satisfaction" is considered to be the forerunner of electro house that brought the genre into the mainstream.

Music videos
The first version of the music video features the three men and the woman on the cover of Hypnotica. It consists of one three-second take of the four people turning to face the camera and smile, played in slow-motion to match the length of the song. Overlaid are various animations including close-up pictures of the lips of a man and a woman singing along to the song. This music video was barely played on music channels, although in some countries, it replaced the "construction" version.

The second and most famous version of the music video features women in skimpy construction outfits. The video plays almost as a musical advertisement for a variety of power tools. All are used in a sexual manner. This version was mainly relegated to nighttime hours. It stars British lad mag models Jerri Byrne, Rachel Hallett, Thekla Roth and Natasha Mealey, American Playboy Playmate Suzanne Stokes and British Page 3 girl model turned porn star and escort Lena Franks.

Remakes
In 2008, men from Viborg, Denmark, got together to re-enact the music video with middle-aged men. It gained some popularity in Denmark and was covered on TV.

On the International Women's Day in 2011, the women's associations of the General Federation of Belgian Labour and Socialistische Partij Anders released a "Granny Remake" of the original video. It was made to raise awareness of the gender pay gap by showing the scantily clad women still working the same jobs at 60–70 years of age.

2018 Russian protest parodies
In late 2017, cadets at Russia's Ulyanovsk Institute of Civil Aviation marked the end of their term by making a parody of the video that drew on a similar parody four years earlier by British soldiers. Wearing just their uniform caps and ties, belts worn around their shoulders, underwear (with the crotches stuffed) and black boots, the cadets twerked, gyrated suggestively, performed maintenance tasks and cleanup in a fashion similar to the video as the cameraman moved from one to the other in their dormitory. The video, which soon went viral, had strong homoerotic elements and suggestions of BDSM culture.

Officials at the institute, described as the oldest and most prestigious pilot training school in Russia, were furious, particularly since the cadets had used school property and worn their uniform caps. Sergey Krasov, the institute's director, said: "If they had joked like that at home, nobody would have batted an eyelid." Shortly after the video became a subject of national discussion, the Federal Air Transport Agency convened a commission to investigate the video and identify the cadets, believed to be in their first year at the institute, who had made it. "Frivolous dances in underwear with the uniform cap of the Institute covering the face on the grounds of the aviation university are unacceptable" the agency said. Any cadets it found to be involved could face expulsion.

While some prominent Russian commentators expressed similar outrage on government-run television channels, many more sympathized with the cadets, and made videos of their own in support of them. Most were from other groups of students at trade schools for farmers, construction workers and emergency services, but the Russian women's biathlon team also made one. A Ukrainian swim club filmed part of its video underwater, and a group of retired women living in a St. Petersburg communal apartment contributed their own. Russian American journalist Masha Gessen wrote in The New Yorker that the videos were an unexpected and widespread protest against the state's anti-LGBT policies. "Each clip is at once a show of solidarity with a group of young strangers and a show of ordinary people’s ability to organize and act together—an ability that the state would seem to have stamped out."

Track listings

Italian CD single
 "Satisfaction (Isak original edit) – 4:44
 "Satisfaction (Greece dub) – 6:38
 "Satisfaction (B-Deep Remix) – 6:27
 "Satisfaction (Voltaxx extended remix) – 5:39
 "Satisfaction (DJ I.C.O.N. Remix) – 5:29
 "Satisfaction (Poxymusic No School Remix) – 7:11
 "Satisfaction (Robbie Rivera Remix) – 7:51

German CD single
 "Satisfaction (Isak original) – 6:36
 "Satisfaction (Greece dub) – 6:38

UK CD single
 "Satisfaction (radio edit)
 "Satisfaction (Isak original)
 "Satisfaction (Steve Murano Remix)
 "Satisfaction (video)

UK 12-inch single
A. "Satisfaction (Isak original)
B. "Satisfaction (Steve Murano Remix)

UK cassette single
 "Satisfaction (radio edit)
 "Satisfaction (Isak original)
 "Satisfaction (Robbie Rivera Remix)

US CD single
 "Satisfaction (radio edit)
 "Satisfaction (Isak original)
 "Satisfaction (Greece dub)
 "Satisfaction (Steve Murano Remix)
 "Satisfaction (Robbie Rivera Remix)
 "Satisfaction (video)

Australian CD single
 "Satisfaction (radio edit)
 "Satisfaction (Isak original)
 "Satisfaction (Poxymusic No School Remix)
 "Satisfaction (Odd School Mix)
 "Satisfaction (Steve Murano Remix)
 "Satisfaction (Radio Slave Remix)

Charts

Weekly charts

Year-end charts

Certifications

Release history

Samplings
 Ludacris sampled "Satisfaction" in his song "Ultimate Satisfaction" for his album Release Therapy.
 DJ Laz uses song's beat in his song "Move Shake Drop".
 Flo Rida's "Touch Me" from the album R.O.O.T.S. also interpolates parts of "Satisfaction".
 The Paradiso Girls sample the song in their live introduction.

In popular culture
The song was used in a TV commercial for Tooheys Extra Dry lager and Wendy's hamburgers. It appears in the film White Chicks and the video games Just Dance 2, Dance Central, DJ Hero, Steep, Fuser, Saints Row: The Third, and the film Drillbit Taylor as well as in the Beavis and Butt-head episode "Drones".

References

2002 songs
2003 singles
Benny Benassi songs
Electronic songs
House music songs
Song recordings produced by Benny Benassi
Songs written by Alle Benassi